Crionics was a Polish blackened death metal band from Kraków, formed in 1997 by Michał Skotniczny, Dariusz Styczeń, "Marcotic" and Maciej Zięba. In their early years they played fast and melodic metal strongly influenced by Norwegian black metal band Emperor. After releasing of EP Noir, Crionics disbanded in 2011.

Band history
A year after the band formed, they recorded five songs. This material has never been released because of its bad production. Six months later the band recorded their first demo. It contained four tracks, including a cover of Emperor's "I am the Black Wizards". In 1999 Crionics engaged Bartosz Bielewicz as a guitarist. Bielewicz contributed to the band's second demo Beyond the Blazing Horizon, recorded in their home studio. In 2000 Maciej Kowalski replaced drummer Maciej Zięba. In August 2002 the first studio album, entitled Human Error: Ways to Selfdestruction was released. Early in 2004, Crionics released their second album, Armageddon's Evolution. During that year, they also signed a 3-record deal with Candlelight Records. In 2007 their third and latest album Neuthrone was released.

Band members

Timeline

Discography 
 Studio albums
 Human Error: Ways to Selfdestruction (2002)
 Armageddon's Evolution (2004)
 Neuthrone (2007)

 EPs
 Beyond the Blazing Horizon (2000)
 N.O.I.R. (2010)

 Demos
 Demo 98 (1998)

 Music videos

References

External links
 
 Crionics at Candlelight Records

Polish black metal musical groups
Polish heavy metal musical groups
Musical groups established in 1997
Musical quintets
Candlelight Records artists